Lida Lopes Cardozo Kindersley  (born 1954), also known as Lida Lopes Cardozo and Lida Cardozo Kindersley, is a letter-cutter, typeface designer, author and publisher and runs the Cardozo Kindersley Workshop in Cambridge. She is considered the foremost letter-cutter currently working in the United Kingdom and is "dedicated to the increase of good lettering in the world". Her work in slate, stone and other media includes carved memorials, plaques, inscriptions and sundials which can be seen at many public locations in the United Kingdom and beyond. Her works include the ledger stone for the grave of William Blake at Bunhill Fields.  With her first husband David Kindersley she also designed the main gates for the British Library.

Early life and education
Lida Lopes Cardozo was born in 1954 in Leiden in The Netherlands.  She graduated from the Royal Academy of Art, The Hague, in 1976 where she studied lettering with typographer and designer Gerrit Noordzij. It was in his classes that she realised that she wanted to create letters and work in carving stone.

Career

In 1976 she met British stone-carver and type designer David Kindersley at a conference about type design, and soon afterwards relocated to the UK to become his apprentice at his workshop in Cambridge.  This association developed into a close creative partnership which lasted until David's death in 1995.

Lida and David collaborated on many creative works including the British Library gates, a 1980 memorial stone to Richard III at Leicester Cathedral and Stations of the Cross for the London Oratory School and in establishing the Cardozo Kindersley Workshop in Cambridge.

In her subsequent career Lida has created works across the UK and beyond as public and private commissions with a particular focus on gravestones and memorials.

Many of her works can be seen in Cambridge and Cambridge University, including a memorial for Stephen Hawking at Gonville and Caius College.

In 2015 she was awarded an MBE for services to lettercutting.

Sundials

Lida has cut a number of sundials on public buildings including Selwyn College and Pembroke College,  Cambridge. In her work on sundials Lida has collaborated with Dr Frank King, Chairman of the British Sundial Society and Keeper of the Clock at Cambridge University, realising more than 20 of his sundial designs.

Type design
As well as hand-cut letterforms, Lida has designed several digital typefaces including 'Emilida', commissioned by music company EMI and 'Pulle' which is based on letterforms Lida has been cutting for over 20 years and offers a very large range of letter heights rather than variations in weight.

The Cardozo Kindersley Workshop

The Cardozo Kindersley Workshop in Cambridge was established by Lida and David Kindersley and since 1977 has occupied its current location in a converted Victorian school.  Lida trains apprentices in lettercutting by hand, each usually staying at the workshop for three years.

Lida and David co-authored a number of publications on the art of lettering, their workshop, and the importance of apprenticeship. Lida has continued to write on these and other subjects and also publishes works through the Cardozo Kindersley imprint.

The Shingle Street Shell Line

In 2005 Lida and her childhood friend Els Bottema started to arrange a line of shells on the beach at Shingle Street in Suffolk. They began the line as a way of coping with their shared experience of cancer treatment and have returned regularly to maintain and add to the line since then.

Personal life 
Lida Lopes Cardozo married David Kindersley in 1986 and they had three sons together. Two of their sons have joined her in working in the workshop. Her second husband Graham Beck now runs the workshop with her.

Selected publications

References

External links

The Cardozo Kindersley Workshop official website

1954 births
Stone carvers
English graphic designers
People from Leiden
British letter cutters
Living people
Royal Academy of Art, The Hague alumni
Members of the Order of the British Empire
Dutch emigrants to England
Naturalised citizens of the United Kingdom